Keeseekoose 66-KE-05 is an Indian reserve of the Keeseekoose First Nation in Saskatchewan. It is 19 kilometres northeast of Canora. In the 2016 Canadian Census, it recorded a population of 5 living in 1 of its 2 total private dwellings.

References

Indian reserves in Saskatchewan
Division No. 9, Saskatchewan